Elsadig Hassan (born 4 September 1996) is a Sudanese footballer who plays as a centre-back for Al-Shorta Ayearsl-Qadarif and the Sudan national team.

References

1996 births
Living people
Sudanese footballers
Association football defenders
Al Ahli Club (Merowe) players
Sudan international footballers
2021 Africa Cup of Nations players
2022 African Nations Championship players
Sudan A' international footballers